Luna E-8-5M No.412, also known as Luna Ye-8-5M No.412, and sometimes identified by NASA as Luna 1975A, was a Soviet spacecraft which was lost in a launch failure in 1975. It was a  Luna E-8-5M spacecraft, the second of three to be launched. It was intended to perform a soft landing on the Moon, collect a sample of lunar soil, and return it to the Earth.

Luna E-8-5M No.412 was launched at 04:04:56 UTC on 16 October 1975 atop a Proton-K 8K78K launch vehicle with a Blok D-1 upper stage, flying from Site 81/23 at the Baikonur Cosmodrome. The Blok D stage experienced a failure of the LOX turbopump and so the probe did not reach orbit. Prior to the release of information about its mission, NASA correctly identified that it had been an attempted sample return mission. They believed that it was intended to land in Mare Crisium, which was the target for both the Luna 23 and Luna 24 missions; which landed a few hundred metres apart. Since its launch was unsuccessful, it was not acknowledged in the Soviet press at the time.

References

External links 
 RussianSpaceWeb.com

1975 in the Soviet Union
1975 in spaceflight
Luna programme
Sample return missions
Missions to the Moon
Spacecraft launched in 1975